Dorothy McMahan (born November 6, 1976) is an American long-distance runner. She competed in the marathon event at the 2013 World Championships in Athletics in Moscow, Russia.

Personal life
Dorothy McMahan was raised in Hilbert, Wisconsin. Dot McMahan daughter was born in May 2009, and placed 9th (2:32:16) at Houston Texas hosted 2012 US Olympic Trials in the Marathon. She graduated from UW-Milwaukee in 1999.

Coaching community
Since 2013, McMahan has coached distance runners for Boston Marathon qualifiers and personal best times in events from the mile to the 50 km.

Professional
McMahan joined Hanson Brooks Original Distance Project in Rochester Hills, Michigan at age 22 and waited until 30 years old until debuting in the Marathon.

McMahan, alum of the University of Wisconsin-Milwaukee women's track and field team, placed 48th at the 14th IAAF World Half Marathon Championships, October 1, 2005 in Edmonton, Alberta, Canada.

In 2019, USATF named McMahan the national athlete of the week.

References

External links
 

1976 births
Living people
American female long-distance runners
American female marathon runners
World Athletics Championships athletes for the United States
Place of birth missing (living people)
21st-century American women